The Shady Grove School is a historic school building on Arkansas Highway 94 near Pea Ridge, Arkansas.  It is a single-story wood-frame structure, with a hip roof and a concrete foundation.  A gable-roofed cupola provides ventilation to the roof, which is also pierced by a brick chimney.  The main facade consists of a double door flanked by sash windows, and the long sides of the building have banks of sash windows.  Built c. 1922, the building is a well-preserved representative of a period school building.

The building was listed on the National Register of Historic Places in 1988.

See also
National Register of Historic Places listings in Benton County, Arkansas

References

School buildings on the National Register of Historic Places in Arkansas
School buildings completed in 1922
Buildings and structures in Benton County, Arkansas
Pea Ridge, Arkansas
National Register of Historic Places in Benton County, Arkansas
1922 establishments in Arkansas